Heartlands Hospital is an acute general hospital in Bordesley Green, Birmingham, England. It is managed by University Hospitals Birmingham NHS Foundation Trust.

History
The hospital has its origins in an infectious diseases hospital known as City Hospital, Little Bromwich which was completed in June 1895. Intended for activation only at times of medical emergency, it was tasked with responding to a typhoid fever outbreak in 1901. Three additional pavilions and a nurses' home were added in 1904. It treated patients with scarlet fever, measles, diphtheria and tuberculosis during the First World War.

After joining the National Health Service as Little Bromwich Hospital in 1948, it became a general hospital in 1953. It was renamed East Birmingham Hospital in 1963 and saw considerable expansion in the 1970s. The world's last smallpox patient, Janet Parker, was treated at the hospital during the smallpox outbreak in 1978. It became Heartlands Hospital in 1993.

Development
A new Ambulatory Care and Diagnostics Centre is to be built on the site, due to open in 2022.  It will have 120 consultation rooms, 26 specialist audiology and ear nose and throat rooms, ultrasound and X-ray rooms, and CT scan and MRI scanning facilities in a new 18,000 sq metre four-storey building.

References

External links

NHS hospitals in England
Hospitals in Birmingham, West Midlands